Wayne Cuff (born 26 December 1971) is a Jamaican cricketer. He played in ten first-class and five List A matches for the Jamaican cricket team from 1995 to 2002.

See also
 List of Jamaican representative cricketers

References

External links
 

1971 births
Living people
Jamaican cricketers
Jamaica cricketers
Sportspeople from Kingston, Jamaica